Quila, also known as Quila el Grande, is rural town in the municipality of  Tecolotlán in the Mexican State of Jalisco. La Sierra de Quila, a nearby mountain range, was named after the town.

Population
As of the INEGI census of 2005, there were 1,023 people residing in Quila. 492 of them were male, and 531 of them were female.

Fiestas De Quila
Quila el Grande has its traditions. One of which takes place at the beginning of every year. Typically from the first of January to the ninth (each day pertaining to a certain family or area in the pueblo) the village celebrates the catholic Virgen of Guadalupe. Every day, the band is met at the church with the residents and visitors to play and sing "Las Mananitas" to the Virgen Marie. Later on in the afternoon, people gather at the starting part of town and form a parade with floats and Indian dances that lead the way to the catholic church found in the middle of the village. After church, people from out of town set up carnival games, jumpers, and trampolines in the local Plaza where later on the band begins to play. At night toritos are usually lit and beautiful castillos are burned in front of everyone. Some days fireworks even light up the skies. After January 9th from January 10th to January 14th or 15th are the Fiestas Taurinas. On these days people spend most of their days at the terraza where bands and groups are contracted to play cultural and traditional music. Birria is served with a side or rice, beans, and tortillas in the afternoon here as well. Later in the evening the band marches down the town to EL toril where the toros are held. Here is where La jaripea comes in. Many people gather to watch beautiful horses and fierce bulls being taunted by clowns and professionals. After here there is a baile in a salon or at the plaza where many people attend. Quila gets a lot of visitors during these fiestas.

Climate

External links
http://mexico.pueblosamerica.com/i/quila-quila-el-grande/
https://web.archive.org/web/20110722225449/http://galileo.inegi.gob.mx/CubexConnector/validaDatos.do?geograficaE=140880025 - Population of Quila

References

Populated places in Jalisco